Molla Naima Taleghani (d. 1738), also known as Orfi, was an Iranian Shia philosopher and theologian of the late Safavid era.

Life
His full name was Mohammad Naim ibn Muhammad Taqi, and he was from Taleqan, about 50 km west of Tehran. Known as Molla Naima, he was prominent in the late Safavid era. He lived during the reign of king Sultan Husayn (1694-1722), and saw the attack and subsequent ruining of the Safavid capital of Isfahan by the Afghans, a catastrophic incident in Iranian history. Molla Naima had to take refuge in Qom. Little more is known on the life of Molla Naima.

Education
He was educated under the supervision of notable philosopher Muhammad Sadiq Ardestani, on whom there is also little information.

Works
New gloss on Tajrid al-'Iteqad (a new commentary)
Commentary on Usul-Kafi
A gloss on Al-isharat wa al-tanbihat by Avicenna
 Jabr va Tafviz (Predestination and Delegation)
Qaedeh al-Vahed (The principle of unity)
A treatise on modulation of being
 Minhaj Al-Roshd

Notes

References
Anthologie des Philosophes Iraniens depuis le xiiie Siécle jusqú'à nos Jours, Tome III, Textes Choisis et Présentés par Sayyed Jalal al-Din Ashtiyani, Introduction Analytique par Henry Corbin, 1976

Islamic philosophers
1738 deaths
18th-century Iranian philosophers
18th-century writers of Safavid Iran